Dan Goodspeed (born May 20, 1977) is a former American football offensive tackle whose longest stint was with the Winnipeg Blue Bombers of the Canadian Football League (CFL). He also played in the National Football League (NFL) and the XFL.

College career
Goodspeed played college football at Walsh University and Kent State University, having previously attended Lake High School in Uniontown, Ohio.

External links
Just Sports Stats
Saskatchewan Roughriders bio
Profile in Blue Bombers site

1977 births
Living people
American football offensive tackles
American football tight ends
Canadian football offensive linemen
Hamilton Tiger-Cats players
Kent State Golden Flashes football players
Miami Dolphins players
New York Jets players
Orlando Rage players
Players of American football from Cleveland
Players of Canadian football from Cleveland
San Francisco 49ers players
Saskatchewan Roughriders players
Tampa Bay Buccaneers players
Washington Redskins players